Cail may refer to:

People
 Harry Cail (1913–2008), American sport shooter
 Jean-François Cail (1804–1871), French entrepreneur and industrialist 
 William Cail (1849–1925), English rugby pioneer
 Cail MacLean (born 1976), Canadian ice hockey player

CAIL
 Center for American Indian Languages
 Center for American and International Law